William "Buddie" Force (July 17, 1895 – April 2, 1969) was an American left-handed pitcher in baseball's Negro leagues. He played for the Detroit Stars (1921–1923), Baltimore Black Sox (1924–1929), and Brooklyn Royal Giants (1930) and compiled a career record of 60–52 with a 4.21 earned run average and 506 strikeouts in 1,044-1/3 innings pitched. He pitched a no-hitter against St. Louis on June 27, 1922. Force was born in Walker County, Georgia, in 1895. He died in Norfolk, Virginia, in 1969 at age 73.

References

External links
 and Baseball-Reference Black Baseball stats and Seamheads

1895 births
1969 deaths
Detroit Stars players
Baltimore Black Sox players
Brooklyn Royal Giants players
Baseball players from Georgia (U.S. state)
People from Walker County, Georgia
Baseball pitchers
20th-century African-American sportspeople